Legqog (born October 1944) is a retired Tibetan politician.

Biography
Legqog was born in Gyantse County, Tibet in October 1944. He joined the Communist Party of China in 1972.

He was the Chairman of the government of Tibet Autonomous Region of China between 1998 and 2004, when he was replaced by Qiangba Puncog. From 2003 to 2010, he was the chairman of the Autonomous Regional People's Congress of Tibet and of the Standing Committee of Tibet Autonomous Region. In 2010, Qiangba Puncog was retired of the governorship and took Legqog's chairmanship of the Standing Committee. At the same time, the new governor Padma Choling took from Legqog the Presidency of the Tibet Autonomous Region People's Congress. At 66, Xinhua reports, the "former parliament leader...has reached retirement age".

References 

1944 births
Living people
People's Republic of China politicians from Tibet
Tibetan politicians
People from Shigatse
Chinese Communist Party politicians from Tibet
Political office-holders in Tibet
Delegates to the 11th National People's Congress
Delegates to the 10th National People's Congress